The 2019 Argentina Open was a men's tennis tournament played on outdoor clay courts. It was the 22nd edition of the ATP Buenos Aires event, and part of the ATP Tour 250 series of the 2019 ATP Tour. It took place in Buenos Aires, Argentina, from February 11 through 17, 2019.

Singles main draw entrants

Seeds 

 1 Rankings are as of February 4, 2019.

Other entrants 
The following players received wildcards into the singles main draw:
  Félix Auger-Aliassime
  Francisco Cerúndolo
  David Ferrer

The following player received entry as a special exempt:
  Juan Ignacio Londero

The following players received entry from the qualifying draw:
  Marcelo Arévalo 
  Facundo Bagnis
  Rogério Dutra Silva 
  Lorenzo Sonego

Withdrawals
Before the tournament
  Pablo Carreño Busta → replaced by  Christian Garín

Doubles main draw entrants

Seeds 

 1 Rankings are as of February 4, 2019.

Other entrants 
The following pairs received wildcards into the doubles main draw:
  Federico Delbonis /  Guillermo Durán 
  Sander Gillé /  Joran Vliegen

Finals

Singles 

  Marco Cecchinato defeated  Diego Schwartzman, 6–1, 6–2

Doubles 

  Máximo González /  Horacio Zeballos defeated  Diego Schwartzman /  Dominic Thiem, 6–1, 6–1

References

External links 

 

Argentina Open
Argentina Open
ATP Buenos Aires
Argentina Open